Donald Cannon (born August 2, 1979) is an American DJ, record producer, songwriter, and record executive. Cannon is a co-founder of the Atlantic Records imprint, Generation Now. He was also a member of the prominent Atlanta mixtape collective, Aphilliates Music Group, with his long-time collaborator and fellow Generation Now founder, DJ Drama. Over the course of his career, Cannon has produced tracks and albums for artists like Jeezy, Logic, Lil Uzi Vert, Lil Wayne, Ludacris, 50 Cent, and numerous others. He also served as the Vice President of A&R at Def Jam Recordings.

Early life and education

Cannon was born on August 2, 1979 in Philadelphia, Pennsylvania. He was raised largely in West Philadelphia. At the age of 5, he received his first set of turntables, a mixer, and a karaoke machine. By age 11, he had DJed numerous events, including his aunt's wedding reception. After high school, Cannon moved to Atlanta, Georgia to attend Clark Atlanta University. While there, he met up with other Philadelphia natives, DJ Drama and DJ Sense. The three formed the Aphilliates while in college together as a loose collection of DJs. Cannon also began DJing parties and clubs in Atlanta's inner city.

Career

Cannon, along with DJ Drama and DJ Sense, officially co-founded the Aphilliates Music Group (AMG) in Atlanta in 2003. Cannon often produced tracks on DJ Drama's prominent mixtape series, Gangsta Grillz, which featured artists like Jeezy, Lil Wayne, Gucci Mane, Ludacris, Fabolous, T.I., and numerous others.

Some of Cannon's most notable early production credits with Aphilliates included Jeezy's "Go Crazy" featuring Jay-Z, 50 Cent's "Man Down," and Ludacris' "Everybody Hates Chris." Cannon also helped develop mixtape series like Lil Wayne's Dedication, T.I. and P$C's In da Streets, and Jeezy's Trap or Die. He would go on to co-host a show on Atlanta's WHTA and became a music director for the show Streets Iz Watchin on the Sirius XM Radio station, Shade 45. Good Day Atlanta, the morning show on Atlanta's Fox affiliate, also named him "Atlanta's Best DJ."

In September 2006, the Aphilliates Music Group entered into a strategic partnership with Asylum Records. In January 2007, however, Aphilliates' Atlanta offices were raided by local police at the behest of the RIAA, and Cannon and DJ Drama were arrested on RICO charges. Authorities seized 81,000 mixtapes and various pieces of recording equipment in the raid.

That raid and others like it were subject to public outcry in the aftermath, with some music industry insiders describing the RIAA and its constituent members as "schizophrenic." Aphilliates had largely operated with the express permission of major record labels at the time, because AMG helped promote their artists. Neither Cannon nor DJ Drama were ever convicted in relation to the raid.

In December 2008, Cannon announced his departure from the Aphilliates, opting to focus on his own production and promotion company, Cannon Music, LLC. In 2009, he produced the theme song for Tyler Perry's TBS sitcom, House of Payne. He also produced season themes for the Atlanta Hawks and the Atlanta Thrashers. From 2009 to 2012, Cannon produced, mixed, and/or hosted numerous mixtapes and tracks for artists like Big Sean (Finally Famous Vol. 3: Big), The Cool Kids (Gone Fishing), Curren$y (Smokee Robinson), Jeezy (Trap or Die II), Trouble (Green Light), and Lil Reese (Don't Like; hosted with DJ Drama).

In July 2013, Cannon was named the Vice President of A&R at Def Jam Recordings. He is credited with signing and fostering numerous artists while at the label. In August 2013, Cannon reunited with DJ Drama and DJ Sense to co-found a new media collective called The Academy. In September of that year, The Academy announced its initial roster of 23 DJs.

In 2015, Cannon and DJ Drama founded the record label, Generation Now, as an imprint of Atlantic Records. One of the first artists they signed that year was Lil Uzi Vert. Cannon served as executive producer on Uzi's 2015 debut commercial mixtape, Luv Is Rage. He also served as executive producer on Uzi's 2017 studio album, Luv Is Rage 2, which topped the Billboard 200 chart. Other artists that Cannon and Drama have signed to the label include, Skeme, Jack Harlow, Lil James, and Killumantii.

Discography

Recognition and awards

References

External links
Generation Now

1979 births
African-American record producers
American hip hop DJs
American hip hop record producers
East Coast hip hop musicians
Living people
Clark Atlanta University alumni
Mixtape DJs
Musicians from Philadelphia
Place of birth missing (living people)
Record producers from Pennsylvania
21st-century African-American people
20th-century African-American people